, also known as Ichijō Kanera, was the son of regent Tsunetsugu.  He was a kugyō or Japanese court noble of the Muromachi period (1336–1573). He held regent positions sesshō in 1432, and kampaku from 1447 to 1453 and from 1467 to 1470. Norifusa and Fuyuyoshi were his sons. One of his daughters, married Takatsukasa Masahira.

Before the Ōnin War, he "enjoyed universal respect for his scholarship, had a large and distinguished family, and owned perhaps the finest library of the time".  Kaneyoshi fled to Nara, where his son was the abbot of the Kofuku-ji monastery.  He remained there for ten years before returning to the capital.

In 1478 (Bunmei 10), Kanera published Bummei ittō-ki (On the Unity of Knowledge and Culture) which deals with political ethics and six points about the duties of a prince.

Family
 Father: Ichijō Tsunetsugu
 Mother: Hisashiboji Hidenaga's daughter
 Wives
 Nakamikado Nobutoshi's daughter (1405–1473)
 Servant (name unknown)
 Minamoto Yasutoshi's daughter
 Minami no Kata (1443-1490)
 Children:
 Ichijō Norifusa by Nakamikado Nobutoshi's daughter
 Ichijō Fuyuyoshi by Minami no Kata
 Ichijō Keishi married Takatsukasa Masahira by Minamoto Yasutoshi's daughter

Notes

References
 Keene, Donald. (2003). Yoshimasa and the Silver Pavilion: The Creation of the Soul of Japan. New York: Columbia University Press.
 Nussbaum, Louis Frédéric and Käthe Roth. (2005). Japan Encyclopedia. Cambridge: Harvard University Press. ; OCLC 48943301

External links
 

1402 births
1481 deaths
Fujiwara clan
Ichijō family
People of Muromachi-period Japan
15th-century Japanese historians